Christoph Köler or (in Latin), Christophorus Colerus (1 December 1602 in Bunzlau, Fürstentum Schweidnitz-Jauer - 19 April 1658 in Breslau) was a German poet and writer.  A student of Martin Opitz (1597–1637) and follower of his Baroque poetical reforms, Köler later revised his papers and published a biography of his teacher.  His most noted student was the German priest, and mystical poet Angelus Silesius (1624–1677).

Subsequently, he studied from 1624 to 1629 jurisprudence at the University of Strasbourg, where he joined the historian and philologist Matthias Egger of Bern. Köler returned to Bolesławiec in 1629. He was hired at the Breslauer Elisabeth-Gymnasium in 1634, and was appointed deputy head and Professor in 1637.

Biography

References 

1602 births
1658 deaths
German poets
German male poets
Baroque writers